Grammium or Grammion, also Gramium or Gramion (Γράμιον), was a town of ancient Crete.

The site of Grammium is unlocated.

References

Populated places in ancient Crete
Former populated places in Greece
Lost ancient cities and towns